Rufin Oba (born 20 February 1976 in the Republic of the Congo) is a  Congolese retired footballer who last played for Birkirkara of the Maltese Premier League in 2003.

Malta

Spending three years with Floriana of the Maltese Premier League, Oba was the leading goal-scorer in the 2000–01 Maltese Premier League season with 12 goals. He agreed to join rivals Birkirkara in 2003 and was unveiled late January that year despite being contacted by Floriana. However, Sliema Wanderers impugned the Congolese attacker's transfer to Birkirkara, saying that it violated regulations. By June, he had prematurely ended his three-year contract with the club, with Moroccan mentor Karim Bencherifa planning to take him to Brunei in 2004.

International
In January 1995, Oba scored a goal in a 1996 African Cup of Nations qualifier as Republic of Congo lost 1–2 to Ghana.

References

External links 
 Birkirkara FC Profile

Living people
1976 births
Association football forwards
Republic of the Congo footballers
Republic of the Congo international footballers
Republic of the Congo expatriate footballers
Expatriate footballers in Malta
Floriana F.C. players
Birkirkara F.C. players